"Wasn't Expecting That" is a song recorded by British singer-songwriter Jamie Lawson. It was originally released on 11 March 2011 as the lead single from his third studio album Wasn't Expecting That (2011) and peaked at number 3 on the Irish Singles Chart. Lawson was the first artist signed by Ed Sheeran to his new record label, Gingerbread Man Recordings in 2015. The song was re-released on 3 April 2015 as the lead single from his fourth studio album Jamie Lawson. The song peaked at number 6 on the UK Singles Chart. On 31 July 2016, Lawson performed the song in an episode of the Australian soap Neighbours.

Music video
Three variations of the music video were made: the original, an international version and an Australian version.

The original version of the song was posted as an acoustic performance to YouTube in January 2011 and now has over 1 million views. 

A music video to accompany the new recording for re-release was posted to YouTube on 26 August 2015 at a total length of three minutes and twenty-eight seconds. The video, directed by award-winning filmmaker Bouha Kazmi, has more than 11 million views on YouTube. The video tells the story of a couple who fall in love, but are then left traumatised when the woman is diagnosed with terminal cancer. It follows the couple as they go back in time throughout their relationship. It shows the woman giving birth, the two getting married and their first kiss. 

A further version was filmed in Sydney for the Australian market when Lawson toured with Ed Sheeran in Australia in 2015.

Charts

Weekly charts

Year-end charts

Certifications

Release history

References

External links
 
 Australian version of the music video on Vimeo

2011 singles
2015 singles
2011 songs
Jamie Lawson (musician) songs
Gingerbread Man Records singles
Songs written by Jamie Lawson (musician)